Angelo Cimadomo (born 11 March 1978) is an Italian footballer. He played as a midfielder. He played for S.S.C. Napoli youth teams and made his debut in Serie A on 14 December 1997 against Parma. He made another presence for Napoli the subsequent year, in Serie B. At the end of the season he was sent to Ascoli where he played 24 matches in two years. He continued his career in Serie C1, C2 and D.

External links
 Profile at legaseriea.it

Living people
1978 births
Italian footballers
Serie A players
S.S.C. Napoli players
Ascoli Calcio 1898 F.C. players
Taranto F.C. 1927 players
A.S. Cosenza Calcio players
F.C. Matera players
A.C. Sansovino players
Association football midfielders